Karnes County is a county in the U.S. state of Texas. As of the 2020 census, the population was 14,710. Its county seat is Karnes City. The county is named for Henry Karnes, a soldier in the Texas Revolution. The former San Antonio and Aransas Pass Railway passed through Karnes County in its connection linking San Antonio with Corpus Christi.

Geography

Major highways
  U.S. Highway 181
  State Highway 72
  State Highway 80
  State Highway 123
  State Highway 239

Adjacent counties
 Gonzales County (northeast)
 DeWitt County (east)
 Goliad County (southeast)
 Bee County (south)
 Live Oak County (southwest)
 Atascosa County (west)
 Wilson County (northwest)

Demographics

As of the 2020 United States census, there were 14,710 people, 4,552 households, and 3,156 families residing in the county.

As of the census of 2000, there were 15,446 people, 4,454 households, and 3,246 families residing in the county. The population density was 21 people per square mile (8/km2). There were 5,479 housing units at an average density of 7 per square mile (3/km2). The racial makeup of the county was 68.55% White, 10.79% Black or African American, 0.68% Native American, 0.43% Asian American, 0.06% Pacific Islander, 17.23% of other races, and 2.26% of two or more races. 47.42% of the population were Hispanic or Latino American of any race.

There were 4,454 households, out of which 34.00% had children under the age of 18 living with them, 53.60% were married couples living together, 13.70% had a female householder with no husband present, and 27.10% were non-families. 24.40% of all households were made up of individuals, and 13.60% had someone living alone who was 65 years of age or older. The average household size was 2.66 and the average family size was 3.15.

In the county, the population was spread out, with 21.80% under the age of 18, 11.50% from 18 to 24, 34.20% from 25 to 44, 18.20% from 45 to 64, and 14.40% who were 65 years of age or older. The median age was 34 years. For every 100 females there were 146.20 males. For every 100 females age 18 and over, there were 162.50 males.

The median income for a household in the county was $26,526, and the median income for a family was $30,565. Males had a median income of $27,260 versus $19,367 for females. The per capita income for the county was $13,603. About 18.50% of families and 21.90% of the population were below the poverty line, including 29.10% of those under age 18 and 20.50% of those age 65 or over.

Economy

Around 2008 ConocoPhillips drilled a well in Karnes County and struck oil, causing an economic boom.

Communities

Cities
 Falls City
 Karnes City (county seat)
 Kenedy

Town
 Runge

Unincorporated communities

 Cestohowa
 Choate
 Ecleto
 Gillett
 Hobson
 Panna Maria

Ghost towns
 Helena
 Wintergreen

Politics

Education
School districts include:
 Falls City Independent School District
 Karnes City Independent School District
 Kenedy Independent School District
 Nixon-Smiley Consolidated Independent School District
 Nordheim Independent School District
 Pawnee Independent School District
 Pettus Independent School District
 Runge Independent School District

Coastal Bend College (formerly Bee County College) is the designated community college for the county.

See also

 National Register of Historic Places listings in Karnes County, Texas
 Recorded Texas Historic Landmarks in Karnes County

References

External links
 The Karnes Countywide newspaper
 Henry Karnes' entry in Biographical Encyclopedia of Texas hosted by the Portal to Texas History].
 
 Genealogy in Karnes County, Texas

 
1854 establishments in Texas
Populated places established in 1854